Hymns II may refer to:

 Hymns II (2nd Chapter of Acts album), 1988
 Hymns II (Michael W. Smith album), 2016

See also
 Hymns (disambiguation)